A women's Test match is an international four-innings cricket match held over a maximum of four days between two of the leading cricketing nations. Women's cricket was played in South Africa fairly regularly throughout the beginning of the 20th century, but died out during the Second World War. It was revived in 1949 by a group of enthusiasts, and in 1951 Netta Rheinberg, on behalf of the Women's Cricket Association, suggested that a South Africa Women's Cricket Association be formed, and encouraged the possibility that a series of matches could be played between the two associations. The South Africa & Rhodesian Women's Cricket Association (SA&RWCA) was officially formed in 1952. At their annual general meeting in January 1955, the SA&RWCA accepted an invitation from the Women's Cricket Association to join an International Women's Cricket Council that, in addition to South Africa, included England, Australia and New Zealand. They also agreed that international matches would be played between the four nations. In 1959, arrangements were made for the first international women's cricket tour of South Africa, as they would play host to the English team in 1960.

The first Test involving South Africa women was held at St George's Park, Port Elizabeth, the same venue as the one for first men's Test match in the country in 1889, and ended in a draw. South Africa then played a subsequent series against New Zealand in 1971–72. As part of the international campaign against apartheid, the Commonwealth of Nations signed the Gleneagles Agreement in 1977, excluding South Africa from competing in international sporting events. Because of this exclusion, they did not play another Test until hosting India in 2001–02, before facing England again in 2003, the Netherlands in 2007, India in 2014 and most recently England in 2022.

South Africa have played thirteen Test matches, seven of which were played pre-exclusion, and six of them post-exclusion. Two players, Jennifer Gove and Lorna Ward, have played all seven matches pre-exclusion. Yvonne van Mentz, Brenda Williams, Mignon du Preez, and Marizanne Kapp are the only South African women to have scored Test centuries, while Jean McNaughton, Lorna Ward and Sunette Loubser have all taken five-wicket hauls, with Ward doing it on three occasions. This list contains every woman who has played Test cricket for South Africa. The list is initially arranged in the order in which each player won her Test cap. Where more than one player won her first Test cap in the same Test match, those players are initially listed alphabetically by the surname the player was using at the time of the match.

Key

Test cricketers
Statistics are correct as of 30 June 2022 after South Africa's most recent Test match, against England.

Test captains

References

 
Women Test cricketers
Test cricketers
South Africa